Alexander Deane (born 24 June 1979) is an English writer, political commentator and consultant. He is a regular commentator on Sky News and BBC Dateline London.

Education
Deane was educated at County Upper School, a state comprehensive school in Bury St Edmunds in Suffolk, followed by Trinity College at the University of Cambridge, where he read English Literature, graduating in 2000, and at Griffith University in Australia, where he was a Rotary Scholar, and graduated with an MA in International Relations in 2002. During his time training to be a barrister at Middle Temple he won the 2004 World Universities Debating Championship.

Career
Deane was called to the bar at Middle Temple in 2005. He served as Chief of Staff to David Cameron and Tim Collins during their respective periods as Shadow Secretary of State for Education.
He served as the founding director of Big Brother Watch from 2009 to 2011.

In 2011 Deane was elected as Commoner (the City equivalent of a Councillor) to the Court of Common Council for the ward of Farringdon Without and was reelected at the 2013 City of London Corporation election, he served until the 2017 City of London Corporation election.
He is a current member of The Freedom Association's management committee.

His main role is Senior Managing Director, Head of UK Public Affairs for FTI Consulting having joined the company in 2014 and often appears in the media as a political commentator; he is a Sky News regular and a BBC Dateline London panelist.

He was the executive director of the eurosceptic Grassroots Out campaign

Commentating on allegations that Boris Johnson groped Charlotte Edwardes, Deane quoted Alan Clark who said: "How do I know my advances are unwanted until I’ve made them?".

In 2018 he was shortlisted for the Ipswich seat for a prospective general election, but lost to Tom Hunt.

He is the author of "Lessons From History"

References

External links

 Alexander John Cameron Deane, Deputy City of London Council
 Alex Deane Twitter

Living people
Alumni of Trinity College, Cambridge
Griffith University alumni
Members of the Middle Temple
1979 births